Watene is a surname of New Zealand Maori origin and may refer to:

Adam Watene (1977-2008), New Zealand-Cook Islander Rugby League player
Dallin Watene-Zelezniak (born 1995), New Zealand Rugby League player
Frank Watene (born 1977), New Zealand Rugby League player
Puti Tipene Watene (1910-1967), New Zealand Rugby League player and politician 

Māori-language surnames